AquaFed: the International Federation of Private Water Operators, is an international advocacy group that connects international organisations with private water and wastewater service providers.

Created in 2005, AquaFed is the International Federation of Private Water Operators. Based in Paris and with a liaison office in Brussels, AquaFed represents more than 400 private operators providing water and sanitation services in more than 40 countries around the world.

Associations
AquaFed is a member of the World Water Council, a Partner of UN-Water and a founding member of the Water Integrity Network, amongst others.

In 2008, AquaFed contributed to the Global Corruption Report on the topic of corruption in the water sector.

Members
As of April 2016 the Federation represents more than 400 companies in 40 countries worldwide.

Aquafed Members include:
ABCon - Brazilian National Association of Water and Wastewater Provider 
AFEB - Association Fédérative des gestionnaires privés de réseaux d'Eau du Bénin
ANDESS Asociación Nacional de Empresas de Servicios Sanitarios - Chile
APROVAK Asociace provozovatelu vodovodu a kanalizací CR
APWO - Uganda Association of Private Water Operators 
FP2E (Fédération Professionnelle des Entreprises de l'Eau), France 
NAWC - National Association of Water Companies United States
Agbar - Sociedad General de Aguas de Barcelona
LYDEC 
Odebrecht Ambiental
PT PAM Lyonnaise Jaya (PALYJA)

SENEGALAISE DES EAUX

Remondis
SUEZ
Macao Water Company
Veolia
Vergnet Hydro

Comparable initiatives

World Water Council
World Business Council for Sustainable Development (WBCSD)
International Chamber of Commerce (ICC) 
Business Action for Water
World Economic Forum (which launched a Water Initiative in 2005)
International Private Water Association (IPWA)

References

External links
AquaFed website

Water management
Sanitation
Organizations established in 2005
2005 establishments in France

SAUR Sevan
SODECI